Azuma may refer to:

Places
 Azuma, historical name for eastern Japan, now called Kantō and Tōhoku region
 Azuma, Gunma (Agatsuma), former village in Agatsuma District, Gunma Prefecture, Japan
 Azuma, Gunma (Sawa), former village in Sawa District, Gunma Prefecture, Japan
 Azuma, Gunma (Seta), former village in Seta District, Gunma Prefecture, Japan
 Azuma, Ibaraki, former town in Ibaraki Prefecture, Japan
 Azuma, Kagoshima, former town in Kagoshima Prefecture, Japan
 Mount Azuma, volcano in Fukushima Prefecture, Japan

People
 Azuma (name)

Ships
 Japanese ironclad Azuma, an ironclad warship of the Imperial Japanese Navy
 , an armored cruiser of the Imperial Japanese Navy

Other uses
 Azuma's inequality, result in probability theory
 British Rail Class 800 and 801 trains as used on the East Coast Main Line in the United Kingdom

See also
 Higashi (disambiguation)
 Inazuma (disambiguation)
 East (disambiguation)